The 1980 Southern Conference men's basketball tournament took place from February 23–March 1, 1980. The quarterfinal round was hosted at campus sites, while the semifinals and finals were hosted at the Roanoke Civic Center in Roanoke, Virginia. The Furman Paladins, led by head coach Eddie Holbrook, won their sixth Southern Conference title and received the automatic berth to the 1980 NCAA tournament.

Format
The top eight finishers of the conference's nine members were eligible for the tournament. Teams were seeded based on conference winning percentage. The tournament used a preset bracket consisting of three rounds.

Bracket

* Overtime game

See also
List of Southern Conference men's basketball champions

References

Tournament
Southern Conference men's basketball tournament
Southern Conference men's basketball tournament
Southern Conference men's basketball tournament
Southern Conference men's basketball tournament